Jagdish Kumble  is an Indian professional kabaddi player and coach. He coaches the Telugu Titans in the Pro Kabaddi League. He was member of the India national kabaddi team that won Asian games gold medals in 2002 which was held at Busan.He is the only player who won gold medal in kabaddi from Kerala.

Jagdish Kumble runs a kabaddi academy in Kasargod, Kerala

References

Living people
Indian kabaddi players
Year of birth missing (living people)
Asian Games medalists in kabaddi
Kabaddi players at the 2002 Asian Games
Asian Games gold medalists for India
Medalists at the 2002 Asian Games
Place of birth missing (living people)